The name Rainier ( or ; , a French form of Rainer) may refer to:


Given name
 Reginar II, Count of Hainaut (890–932), also written Rainier II
 Rainier, Margrave of Tuscany, Margrave of Tuscany from 1014 to 1027
 Rainier, Marquess of Montferrat (c.1084–1135)
 Rainerius (c. 1115/1117–1160), also spelled Rainier, patron saint of Pisa and travelers
 Renier of Montferrat (1162–1183), son-in-law of Byzantine Emperor Manuel I Komnenos
 Several princes of Monaco, of the House of Grimaldi:
 Rainier I of Monaco, Lord of Cagnes (1267–1314)
 Rainier II, Lord of Monaco (14th century)
 Rainier III, Prince of Monaco (1923–2005)

Surname
 John Harvey Rainier (1847–1915), British admiral
 John Spratt Rainier (1777–1822), British rear-admiral and Member of Parliament
 Peter Rainier (Royal Navy officer, born 1741) (1741–1808), British admiral and Member of Parliament
 Priaulx Rainier (1903–1986), South African-British composer

Fiction
 Charles Rainier, main character in the novel Random Harvest by James Hilton
 Rainier Wolfcastle, an action hero star in The Simpsons episodes and comics

See also

 Rainer (disambiguation)

French masculine given names